Visitors to Oman must obtain a visa prior to travel unless they come from one of the visa exempt countries.

Citizens of member nations of the Gulf Cooperation Council may travel to Oman without visa limits. Nationals of 71 other countries and territories can apply for visas online which are valid for a period of 30 days. All visitors must hold a passport valid for 6 months.

In an effort to bolster the tourism sector, citizens from 103 countries are now allowed to enter the sultanate for up to 14 days without securing a prior visa.

Visa policy map

Visa exemption 
Citizens of the following countries do not require a visa to visit Oman:

Holders of diplomatic or official passports of Belarus, Cyprus, Germany, Japan, Kazakhstan, Portugal, Romania, Russia, South Korea and Switzerland do not require a visa for up to 90 days.Also Colombia and Oman signed visa-waiver agreement for Diplomatic,service and official passports

eVisa
Citizens of the following 72 countries and territories, may obtain a single or multiple entry eVisa valid for 30 days online.

1 - Issued free of charge.
2 - Valid for 3 months.

On 21 March 2018 it became possible to apply online for an Oman eVisa in addition to being able to obtain an Oman visit visa at Oman's border posts. It is planned that persons arriving to Oman without eVisa will be able to apply for one in a designated area of the arrivals terminal before the passport control. There is concern this could discourage tourists from visiting Oman.

Visa on arrival
Oman stopped issuing visas on arrival in February 2019.

There are currently temporary 'Visa on arrival kiosks' in Muscat International airport for those, who didn't apply for an eVisa, however, there is no information on how long these kiosks are going to be there for, so it is advisable to apply for an eVisa before flying Oman. In November 2019 Oman authorities announced that all visitors should obtain an eVisa in advance and that visas on arrival would be granted only as an exception.

Conditional eVisa
Citizens of the following 23 countries, including their spouses and children of another nationality, can obtain an online eVisa, if they hold a valid Schengen Visa, a valid visa from Australia, Canada, Japan, the United Kingdom, or the United States, or a residence permit from one of these countries. One can apply for a single-entry visa (5 OMR for 10 days or 20 OMR 30 days), or 1-year-valid multiple-entry visa (for 50 OMR). The allowed duration of stay is 10 days for 10 days visa and 30 days for other visas (or 30 days per visit on the multiple-entry visa).

Common visa

Dubai
Holders of a visa or entrance stamp of the Emirate of Dubai that is valid for at least 21 days are visa exempt. Eligible nationalities are:

Qatar
Holders of a visa for Qatar that is valid for travel to Oman and valid for at least one month are visa exempt when arriving directly from Qatar. Eligible nationalities are:

Transit Without Visa
Visitors from any country who hold onward tickets may transit through Oman without a visa for up to 6 hours if proceeding by the same flight.

Passenger ships
Oman grants visas without cost or at a nominal charge to passengers and crew of visiting ships based on the ship provided manifest.

See also
Visa requirements for Omani citizens

References

External links

Sultanate of Oman - Royal Oman Police - eVisa
eVisa Oman Twitter
Oman eVisa Entry Requirements
OMAN VISA POLICY
OMAN VISA POLICY
G1 COUNTRIES

 

Oman
Foreign relations of Oman